Ejowvokoghene Divine Oduduru (born 7 October 1996) is a Nigerian sprinter specializing in the 100-meter and 200-meter dash. He holds personal bests of 9.86 seconds for the 100 m and 19.73 seconds for the 200 m. The latter is a Nigerian national record.

In age category competitions, he was a twice-champion at the African Youth Athletics Championships, a five-time African Junior Champion in the sprints and the 200 m silver medallist at the 2014 World Junior Championships. He represented his country as a senior athlete at the 2014 Commonwealth Games and 2014 African Championships in Athletics, before winning 200 m silver medals at the 2015 and 2019 African Games as well as the 2018 African Championships.

He is a two-time Nigerian national champion and is a four-time NCAA champion in American collegiate competition, running for the Texas Tech Red Raiders. He is sponsored by Puma.

Career

Under-20 competition
He was the gold medalist in both the 100 metres and 200 metres at the 2013 African Youth Athletics Championships. He was a finalist in the 200 m at the 2013 World Youth Championships in Athletics. He won the 200 m at the 2013 African Junior Championships and was also a member of the Gold medal winning 4 × 100 m relay quartet. He successfully defended his 200 m title at the 2015 African Junior Championships and also added the 100 m and 4 × 100 m gold medals to his tally. This made him a five-time African Junior Champion.

Oduduru became known for his interviews, with his interviews at the 2013 World Youth Championships in Athletics gaining popularity among fans, including his phrase 'deadly day'. Memes and videos have been generated using his responses to journalists. He lamented the inadequate support for Nigerian athletes and made a plea for sponsorship during the 2016 Nigeria Championships.

In 2014, he dipped under 21 seconds for the first time. He became the Nigerian National Champion in the 200 metres. After setting a PB of 20.66 s in the semifinals at the 2014 World Junior Championships, he went on to win the silver medal in a windy 20.25 s behind Trentavis Friday of the US.

Senior career
He led off the Nigerian 4x100 metres relay team at the 2014 Commonwealth Games, a team supported by former American athletes, Monzavous Edwards and Mark Jelks, who were running for Nigeria in their first international relay.

Due to illness, he pulled out of the 2015 Nigerian Championships and could not defend his 200 m title. He, however, bounced back for the All-Africa Games in Brazzaville. Oduduru ran a PB of 20.45 s into a headwind of 1.2 m/s to win the silver medal behind Ivorian sprinter, Hua Wilfried Koffi. His team mate and 2015 Nigerian champion Tega Odele placed third. Oduduru was selected for the 200 m at the 2016 African Championships in Durban. After posting the second-fastest time in the semifinals, he did not run in the finals due to injury.

At the 2018 Michael Johnson Invitational meet in Waco, Texas, Divine improved his personal best in the 100 m to 10.10 s, improving the Texas Tech school record by 0.01 s. A year later at the same meet he improved his personal bests and set world-leading times of 9.94 s and 19.76 s, in the 100 m and 200 m respectively. His time in the 200 m broke the national record of 19.84 s set by Francis Obikwelu in 1999.

During 2019, he focused mainly on collegiate competition. He set a personal best in the 60-meter dash at the 2019 Big 12 Indoor Championships, running 6.52 seconds for the distance to win the regional title. He also won the 200 m Big 12 Indoor title. At the 2019 NCAA Division I Indoor Track and Field Championships he won the 200 m title and placed seventh in the 60 m final. At the Big 12 Outdoor Championships, he won the 100 m in 9.99 seconds, having broken the 10-second barrier for the first time at the earlier Michael Johnson Invitational meet. He also helped the Texas Tech Red Raiders to the 4 × 100 m relay title. At the 2019 NCAA Division I Outdoor Track and Field Championships, he won a sprint double in the 100 m and 200 m, as well as taking third in the 4 × 100 m relay. His 100 m time of  9.86 seconds was the fastest in the world at that point of the season, and his 200 m time of 19.73 seconds was a championships record.

Oduduru made his debut on the 2019 IAAF Diamond League circuit at the 2019 Herculis meet, but finished in last place.

2023: Provisional suspension
On February 9, 2023, Athletics Integrity Unit announced that Oduduru had been provisionally suspended for possession/use or attempted use of a prohibited substance (two potential Anti-Doping Rule Violations) in connection with the case of Blessing Okagbare, his compatriot banned for 11 years in 2022. Oduduru faces a six-year ban.

Statistics
Information from World Athletics profile.

Personal bests

Seasonal bests

International competitions

National competitions

NCAA results from Track & Field Results Reporting System.

See also
 2019 in 100 metres

Notes

References

External links

Divine Oduduru bio at Texas Tech Red Raiders
Divine Oduduru on Twitter

Living people
1996 births
Sportspeople from Delta State
Nigerian male sprinters
Olympic athletes of Nigeria
Athletes (track and field) at the 2016 Summer Olympics
Commonwealth Games competitors for Nigeria
Athletes (track and field) at the 2014 Commonwealth Games
African Games silver medalists for Nigeria
African Games medalists in athletics (track and field)
Athletes (track and field) at the 2015 African Games
Texas Tech Red Raiders men's track and field athletes
Athletes (track and field) at the 2019 African Games
Athletes (track and field) at the 2020 Summer Olympics
21st-century Nigerian people